Tommaso Arrigoni (born 26 February 1994) is an Italian footballer who plays as a midfielder for Italian Serie C club Como.

Club career
On 16 August 2012 Arrigoni left for Tritium in temporary deal. On 24 January 2013 he was re-called from Trezzo sull'Adda. and immediately called-up against Vicenza Calcio, wore no.37 shirt. On 31 January 2014 he was signed by S.P.A.L. 2013.

On 17 July 2014 Tommaso and Leonardo Arrigoni, Marco Đurić, Nicola Capellini and Fabio Reato were signed by Forlì.

On 31 August 2015 Tommaso was signed by Santarcangelo in another loan.

On 13 July 2016 Arrigoni was signed by Lumezzane.

On 20 August 2020, he signed a 2-year contract with Como.

International career
Arrigoni received call-up from U16 and U18 team but only make his debut in an unofficial match. He received a call-up to a U17 international tournament. However he was later replaced by Angelo Chiavazzo.

Personal life
His uncle Daniele Arrigoni is a former footballer and currently a football coach. Leonardo Arrigoni, son of Daniele is also a professional footballer.

Tommaso's brother Alfredo died in 2013.

References

External links
 Football.it Profile 

1994 births
People from Cesena
Living people
Italian footballers
Association football midfielders
A.C. Cesena players
Tritium Calcio 1908 players
S.P.A.L. players
Forlì F.C. players
Santarcangelo Calcio players
F.C. Lumezzane V.G.Z. A.S.D. players
S.S.D. Lucchese 1905 players
A.C.N. Siena 1904 players
Como 1907 players
Serie A players
Serie B players
Serie C players
Footballers from Emilia-Romagna
Sportspeople from the Province of Forlì-Cesena